Gadiel is both a given name and a surname. Notable people with the name include:

An archangel in Jewish and Christian mysticism. Known as an angel of holiness and love.
 Gadiel, recording artist; see WY Records
 Gadiel Figueroa Robles (born 1986), football (soccer) player
 Gadiel Miranda, judoka
 Tanya Gadiel (née Barber) (born 1972), a former Australian politician